The affine cipher is a type of monoalphabetic substitution cipher, where each letter in an alphabet is mapped to its numeric equivalent, encrypted using a simple mathematical function, and converted back to a letter. The formula used means that each letter encrypts to one other letter, and back again, meaning the cipher is essentially a standard substitution cipher with a rule governing which letter goes to which. As such, it has the weaknesses of all substitution ciphers. Each letter is enciphered with the function , where  is the magnitude of the shift.

Description
Here, the letters of an alphabet of size  are first mapped to the integers in the range . It then uses modular arithmetic to transform the integer that each plaintext letter corresponds to into another integer that correspond to a ciphertext letter.
The encryption function for a single letter is 

The decryption function is 

where  is the modular multiplicative inverse of  modulo . I.e., it satisfies the equation 

It can be shown as follows that decryption function is the inverse of the encryption function,

Weaknesses
Since the affine cipher is still a monoalphabetic substitution cipher, it inherits the weaknesses of that class of ciphers. The Caesar cipher is an Affine cipher with  since the encrypting function simply reduces to a linear shift. The Atbash cipher uses .

Considering the specific case of encrypting messages in English (i.e. ), there are a total of 286 non-trivial affine ciphers, not counting the 26 trivial Caesar ciphers. This number comes from the fact there are 12 numbers that are coprime with 26 that are less than 26 (these are the possible values of ). Each value of  can have 26 different addition shifts (the  value); therefore, there are 12 × 26 or 312 possible keys. This lack of variety renders the system as highly insecure when considered in light of Kerckhoffs' Principle.

The cipher's primary weakness comes from the fact that if the cryptanalyst can discover (by means of frequency analysis, brute force, guessing or otherwise) the plaintext of two ciphertext characters then the key can be obtained by solving a simultaneous equation.

The same type of transformation used in affine ciphers is used in linear congruential generators, a type of pseudorandom number generator. This generator is not a cryptographically secure pseudorandom number generator for the same reason that the affine cipher is not secure.

Example
In this example showing encryption and decryption, the alphabet is going to be the letters A through Z, and will have the corresponding values found in the following table.

Encryption 
Only the value of  has a restriction since it has to be coprime with 26. The possible values that  could be are 1, 3, 5, 7, 9, 11, 15, 17, 19, 21, 23, and 25. The value for  can be arbitrary as long as  does not equal 1 since this is the shift of the cipher. Thus, the encryption function for this example will be . The first step in encrypting the message is to write the numeric values of each letter. 

The following table shows the first four steps of the encrypting process.

The final step in encrypting the message is to look up each numeric value in the table for the corresponding letters. In this example, the encrypted text would be IHHWVCSWFRCP. The table below shows the completed table for encrypting a message in the Affine cipher.

Decryption 
In this decryption example, the ciphertext that will be decrypted is the ciphertext from the encryption example. To begin, write the numeric equivalents to each letter in the ciphertext, as shown in the table below.

Now, the next step is to compute , and then take the remainder when that result is divided by 26. The following table shows the results of both computations.

The final step in decrypting the ciphertext is to use the table to convert numeric values back into letters. The plaintext in this decryption is AFFINECIPHER. Below is the table with the final step completed.

Entire alphabet encoded
To make encrypting and decrypting quicker, the entire alphabet can be encrypted to create a one-to-one map between the letters of the cleartext and the ciphertext. In this example, the one-to-one map would be the following:

Programming examples
The following Python code can be used to encrypt text with the affine cipher:# Prints a transposition table for an affine cipher.
# a must be coprime to m=26.
def affine(a: int, b: int) -> None:
    for i in range(26):
        print(chr(i+ord('A')) + ": " + chr(((a*i+b)%26)+ord('A')))

# An example call
affine(5, 8)

See also 
 Affine functions
 Atbash code
 Caesar cipher
 ROT13
 Topics in cryptography

References

 

Classical ciphers